Željko Vuković may refer to:

 Željko Vuković (footballer, born 1962), Croatian and Austrian international footballer
 Željko Vuković (footballer, born 1963), Montenegrin footballer